Awaking was a Taiwanese pop music duo, formed by Jay Shih and Wesley Chia. They released their self-titled debut album in 2004, and the first single from the album, "Dream", became a modest hit in Taiwan. The song was subsequently covered by Vivian Hsu on her album The Secret to Happiness Is Love.

In 2006, the pair was nominated for Best Vocal Collaboration at the 17th Golden Melody Awards for the album Happiness Download.

Discography

Studio albums

Awards and nominations

References

External links
 Awaking on KKBox
 Awaking on MyMusic

Taiwanese boy bands
Taiwanese musical duos
Musical groups established in 2004
Musical groups disestablished in 2008